Whitlock Island is an island near Jurien Bay in Western Australia.

The former Carnarvon Tramway crosses the northern part of the island and the old Whitlock station is still present.

A population of Jurien Bay skinks, a threatened species, is known to inhabit the island. Dibblers were discovered on Boullager and Whitlock Islands in 1985; they represent the only original
island populations of the species left.

See also
 List of islands of Western Australia

References

Islands of the Mid West (Western Australia)
Nature reserves in Western Australia
Turquoise Coast (Western Australia)